Katrina Voss worked as a bilingual broadcast meteorologist for The Weather Channel Latin America and AccuWeather and holds the AMS Seal.
She is known for being a regular columnist for the secular humanist journal Free Inquiry magazine. Her work has also appeared in New Scientist, The Humanist, and Bulletin of the American Meteorological Society where she wrote about sharing a name with a devastating hurricane. After Hurricane Katrina's impact in 2005, her comments on hurricane naming and its psychological consequences were cited in the media. She has also questioned the merits of the American Meteorological Society's phasing out of their Seal of Approval and replacement with the Certified Broadcast Meteorologist (CBM) Seal.

In an August 2009 issue of New Scientist, she took a controversial position on DNA privacy.

She is a science education video contributor to SciVee and is married to population geneticist Mark D. Shriver.

References

External links
Official website

American television meteorologists
Living people
People from Durham, North Carolina
Year of birth missing (living people)